Severino de Ramos Clementino da Silva (born 10 January 1986), known as Nino Paraíba or simply Nino, is a Brazilian footballer who plays for América Mineiro as a right back.

Club career

Early career
Born in Rio Tinto, Paraíba, Nino made his senior debut with Desportiva Guarabira in 2006. In 2008, after an unassuming spell at Ceará, he joined Náutico, but was subsequently released. 

In December 2008 Nino was presented at Sousa, and was a starter with the side crowned champions of 2009 Campeonato Paraibano.

Vitória
On 2 June 2009, after being linked to a move to Bahia, Nino signed for Vitória. He made his first team – and Série A – debut on 4 July, coming on as a second-half substitute for Apodi in a 1–2 away loss against Flamengo.

A backup option during his first two seasons, Nino only became a regular starter during the 2011 campaign, in the Série B. He scored his first league goal on 27 September of that year, netting the last in a 2–0 home win against Ponte Preta.

On 15 June 2012 Nino signed a new three-year deal with Vitória, until 2015. Due to injuries, he lost his first-choice status during the 2013 season to Ayrton.

On 15 April 2015, after being deemed surplus to requirements, Nino was loaned to Avaí in the top tier until December. He was an undisputed starter for the side, featuring in 35 matches as his side suffered relegation.

Ponte Preta
On 9 December 2015, Nino signed a one-year deal with Ponte Preta. On 6 September of the following year, he extended his contract until December 2017.

On 14 May 2017 Nino scored his first goal in the main category of Brazilian football, netting the second in a 4–0 home routing of Sport Recife.

Bahia
On 3 January 2018, free agent Nino signed for Bahia also in the top tier.

Career statistics

Honours
Sousa
Campeonato Paraibano: 2009

Vitória
Campeonato Baiano: 2010, 2013

Bahia
Campeonato Baiano: 2018, 2019, 2020
Copa do Nordeste: 2021

References

External links

1986 births
Living people
Sportspeople from Paraíba
Brazilian footballers
Association football defenders
Campeonato Brasileiro Série A players
Campeonato Brasileiro Série B players
Ceará Sporting Club players
Clube Náutico Capibaribe players
Campinense Clube players
Esporte Clube Vitória players
Avaí FC players
Associação Atlética Ponte Preta players
Esporte Clube Bahia players
América Futebol Clube (MG) players